Hong Kong coronavirus may refer to:
2002–2004 SARS outbreak, coronavirus outbreak which affected Hong Kong in 2003
COVID-19 pandemic in Hong Kong, coronavirus outbreak which affected Hong Kong from 2020